Simbad may refer to:

 Simbad missile, a version of the Mistral
 Simbad robot simulator, a software simulator 
 SIMBAD, a database of astronomical information
 4692 SIMBAD, an asteroid named in honour of the astronomical database.

See also

Sinbad (disambiguation)